Iglène is a village in the commune of Abalessa, in Tamanrasset Province, Algeria. It lies on the north bank of Oued Abalessa, and is connected to the N55A national highway by a local road to the west, near the town of Abalessa.

References

Neighbouring towns and cities

Populated places in Tamanrasset Province